Dergaon Assembly constituency is one of the 126 assembly constituencies of Assam Legislative Assembly. Dergaon forms part of the Kaliabor Lok Sabha constituency.

Dergaon Assembly constituency details

Following are details on Dergaon Assembly constituency-

Country: India.
 State: Assam.
 District: Jorhat district .
 Lok Sabha Constituency: Kaliabor Lok Sabha/Parliamentary constituency.
 Assembly Categorisation: Rural constituency.
 Literacy Level:83.42%.
 Eligible Electors as per 2021 General Elections:  1,74,228 Eligible Electors. Male Electors:86,792 . Female Electors:  87,434 .
 Geographic Co-Ordinates: 26°44'33.0"N 94°06'58.0"E.
 Total Area Covered: 393  square kilometres.
 Area Includes: Dergaon and Kakodanga mouzas in Dergaon thana in Golaghat sub-division; and Porbotia, Khangia, Sarucharai and Baligaon mouzas in Jorhat thana in Jorhat sub-division, of Jorhat district of Assam.
 Inter State Border :Jorhat.
 Number Of Polling Stations: Year 2011-170,Year 2016-179,Year 2021-97.

Members of Legislative Assembly

Following is the list of past members representing Dergaon Assembly constituency in Assam Legislature.

 1957: Debeswar Rajkhowa, Indian National Congress.
 1957: Narendra Nath Sarma, Indian National Congress.
 1957: Ramnath Das, Indian National Congress.
 1962: Ramnath Das, Indian National Congress.
 1965: N.K.Hazaarika, Sanghata Socialist Party.
 1967: Narendra Nath Sarma, Samyukta Socialist Party.
 1973: Imalendra Baruah, Indian National Congress.
 1978: Ramesh Das, Janata Party.
 1983: Hemprakash Narayan, Indian National Congress.
 1985: Bhabendra Nath, Independent.
 1991: Hemprakash Narayan, Indian National Congress.
 1996: Sushila Hazarika, Asom Gana Parishad.
 2001: Hemprakash Narayan, Indian National Congress.
 2006: Sushila Hazarika, Asom Gana Parishad.
 2011: Aroti Hazarika Kachari, Indian National Congress.
 2016: Bhabendra Nath Bharali, Asom Gana Parishad.
 2021: Bhabendra Nath Bharali, Asom Gana Parishad.

Election results

2016 result

See also
 Golaghat district
 Dergaon
 List of constituencies of Assam Legislative Assembly

References

External links 
 

Assembly constituencies of Assam
Golaghat district